Spondylus is a genus of bivalve molluscs, the only genus in the family Spondylidae. They are known in English as spiny oysters or thorny oysters (though they are not, in fact, true oysters).

The significance of Spondylus in Aztec culture 
In addition to its significance in the pre-Columbian times, Spondylus crassiquama was also an important part of Aztec culture. Spondylus amongst Aztecs included: art, jewelry, statues, religious motifs, and at times currency. One example of Spondylus used in art is The double-headed serpent which can be seen amongst images on the right of the page.  While the timeline of the exact name change is unclear, Spondylus princeps is now classified as Spondylus crassiquama. Crassiquama is translated in Latin to "thick-scaled spiny oyster"  

As stated above, Spondylus held immense religious value amongst Aztec culture pre-columbian times and is also a great representation of the relationship between the Aztec empire and nature. To Aztec groups and peoples’, Spondylus was a gift from the gods to be celebrated. Certain Spondylus groups were formed as a result of when and where they can be found seasonally and tend to connect a particular group of Spondylus to specific religious symbols such as the Sun god, the Moon goddess, and the mountain spirits. This led to certain groups of Spondylus being associated with seasonal weather events such as heavy rains or increases in sea temperature along the coast,  as those events were closely associated with particular gods or spirits in Aztec culture .

Spondylus had several key uses in pre-Columbian Aztec history, most predominantly its importance in jewelry, art, and sculpture. Another use of Spondylus, that had to be done with extreme detail and precision, was to create breathtaking masks, vests, and other pieces individuals would use to express how valuable or wealthy they were in life and death. By having the most beautiful Spondylus pieces, meant that individual had immense power within the community "Spondylus in Precolumbian Historic and Contemporary Southwest Jewelry".

Description

The many species of Spondylus vary considerably in appearance.  They are grouped in the same superfamily as the scallops.

They are not closely related to true oysters (family Ostreidae); however, they do share some habits such as cementing themselves to rocks rather than attaching themselves by a byssus.  The two halves of their shells are joined with a ball-and-socket type of hinge, rather than with a toothed hinge as is more common in other bivalves.  They also still retain vestigial anterior and posterior auricles ("ears", triangular shell flaps) along the hinge line, a characteristic feature of scallops, though not of oysters.

As is the case in all scallops, Spondylus spp. have multiple eyes around the edges of their mantle, and they have relatively well-developed nervous systems.  Their nervous ganglia are concentrated in the visceral region, with recognisable optic lobes connected to the eyes.

Evolutionary history
The genus Spondylus appeared in the Mesozoic era, and is known in the fossil records from the Triassic Cassian beds in Italy (235 to 232 million years ago) onwards. About 40 extinct species are known. 

Fossils of these molluscs can be found in fossiliferous marine strata all over the world.  For example, they are present in Cretaceaous rocks in the Fort Worth Formation of Texas, and in the Trent River Formation of Vancouver Island, as well as in other parts of North America.

Distribution
Spiny oysters are found in all subtropical and (especially) tropical seas, usually close to the coasts.

Ecology
Spondylus are filter feeders. The adults live cemented to hard substrates, a characteristic they share, by convergent evolution, with true oysters and jewel boxes. Like the latter, they are protected by spines and a layer of epibionts and, like the former, they can produce pearls. The type of substrate they use depends on the species: many only attach to coral, and the largest diversity of species is found in tropical coral reefs; others, (particularly S. spinosus) however, easily adapt to man-made structures, and have become important invasive species. Others still are often found attached to other shells, perhaps the most common belonging to the genus Malleus.

Uses
Archaeological evidence indicates that people in Neolithic Europe were trading the shells of S. gaederopus to make bangles and other ornaments throughout much of the Neolithic period. The main use period appears to have been from around 5350 to 4200 BC. The shells were harvested from the Aegean Sea, but were transported far into the center of the continent. In the LBK and Lengyel cultures, Spondylus shells from the Aegean Sea were worked into bracelets and belt buckles. Over time styles changed with the middle neolithic favouring generally larger barrel-shaped beads and the late neolithic smaller flatter and disk shaped beads.  Significant finds of jewelry made from Spondylus shells were made at the Varna Necropolis. During the late Neolithic the use of Spondylus in grave goods appears to have been limited to women and children.

S. crassisquama is found off the coast of Colombia and Ecuador and has been important to Andean peoples since pre-Columbian times, serving as both an offering to the Pachamama and as currency. In fact, much like in Europe, the Spondylus shells also reached far and wide, as pre-Hispanic Ecuadorian peoples traded them with peoples as far north as present-day Mexico and as far south as the central Andes. The Moche people of ancient Peru regarded the sea and animals as sacred; they used Spondylus shells in their art and depicted Spondylus in effigy pots. Spondylus were also harvested from the Gulf of California and traded to tribes through Mexico and the American Southwest.

Spondylus shells were the driving factor of trade within the Central Andes and were used in a similar manner to gold nuggets, copper hatches, coca, salt, red pepper, and cotton cloth.

The use of Spondylus shells is what led to an economy of sorts in the Central Andes and led to the development of a merchant class, "mercardes", in different cultures within the Central Andes. This caused the development of different styles of trade that went through evolutionary changes throughout pre-Columbian times. These are reciprocity (home based), reciprocity (boundary), down-the-line trade, central place (redistribution), central place (market exchange), emissary trading, and port of trade. These modes of trade dictate the way that the Spondylus shells are traded, as well as who is benefiting the most from the trades. Modes such as central place (redistribution) require the entity that is the central place to be the one that gains the most benefit from the trade, and modes such as emissary trading and port of trade are the modes that started the "mercardes" class within the Central Andes.

The value of Spondylus shells in the Central Andes stems from supply and demand. There was a lot of demand for Spondylus shells due to the "fetishistic needs to the south".

Even today, there are collectors of Spondylus shells, and a commercial market exists for them. Additionally, some species (especially S. americanus) are sometimes found in the saltwater aquariums.

S. limbatus was commonly ground for mortar in Central America, giving raise to its junior synonym, "S. calcifer".

Some Mediterranean species are edible and are commonly consumed, with S. gaederopus in particular being popular in Sardinia. Tropical species, however, tend to bioaccumulate saxitoxin.
The Romans ate them.  Macrobius in Saturnalia III.13 describes a dinner party in 63 BCE in which there were two courses of Spondylus.

Species
Spondylidae taxonomy has undergone many revisions, mostly due to the fact that identification is traditionally based on the shell only, and this is highly variable. To add to this, while some shallow-water species are extremely common, at least two deep-water ones  are known from a single specimen, while a third (S. gravis) was only rediscovered after 77 years. At least another common species (S. regius) has a different shell when it grows in deep water.

 
Spondylus americanus Hermann, 1781 - Atlantic thorny oyster
Spondylus anacanthus Mawe, 1823 - nude thorny oyster
Spondylus aonis d'Orbigny, 1850
Spondylus asiaticus Chenu, 1844
Spondylus asperrimus G. B. Sowerby II, 1847
Spondylus aucklandicus P. Marshall, 1918
Spondylus avramsingeri Kovalis, 2010
 † Spondylus bostrychites Guppy, 1867 
Spondylus butleri Reeve, 1856
Spondylus candidus Lamarck, 1819
Spondylus clarksoni Lamprell, 1992
Spondylus concavus Deshayes in Maillard, 1863
Spondylus crassisquama Lamarck, 1819
Spondylus croceus Schreibers, 1793
Spondylus darwini Jousseaume, 1882
Spondylus deforgesi Lamprell & Healy, 2001
Spondylus depressus Fulton, 1915
Spondylus eastae Lamprell, 1992
Spondylus echinatus Schreibers, 1793
Spondylus erectospinosus Habe, 1973
Spondylus exiguus Lamprell & Healy, 2001
Spondylus exilis G. B. Sowerby III, 1895
Spondylus fauroti Jousseaume, 1888
Spondylus foliaceus Schreibers, 1793
Spondylus gaederopus Linnaeus, 1758 - European thorny oyster
Spondylus gloriandus Melvill & Standen, 1907
Spondylus gloriosus Dall, Bartsch & Rehder, 1938
 † Spondylus granulosus Deshayes, 1830 
Spondylus gravis Fulton, 1915
Spondylus groschi Lamprell & Kilburn, 1995
Spondylus gussonii O. G. Costa, 1830
Spondylus heidkeae Lamprell & Healy, 2001
Spondylus imperialis Chenu, 1844
 Spondylus jamarci Okutani, 1983
Spondylus Lamarckii Chenu, 1845
Spondylus layardi Reeve, 1856
Spondylus leucacanthus Broderip, 1833
Spondylus limbatus G. B. Sowerby II, 1847
Spondylus linguafelis G. B. Sowerby II, 1847
Spondylus maestratii Lamprell & Healy, 2001
Spondylus marinensis Cossignani & Allary, 2018
Spondylus mimus Dall, Bartsch & Rehder, 1938
Spondylus morrisoni Damarco, 2015
Spondylus multimuricatus Reeve, 1856
Spondylus multisetosus Reeve, 1856
 † Spondylus multistriatus Deshayes, 1830 
Spondylus nicobaricus Schreibers, 1793
Spondylus occidens G. B. Sowerby III, 1903
Spondylus ocellatus Reeve, 1856
Spondylus orstomi Lamprell & Healy, 2001
Spondylus ostreoides E. A. Smith, 1885
Spondylus pratii Parth, 1990
Spondylus proneri Lamprell & Healy, 2001
 Spondylus pseudogaederopus T. Cossignani, 2022
  Spondylus purpurascens T. Cossignani, 2022
 † Spondylus radula Lamarck, 1806 
Spondylus raoulensis W. R. B. Oliver, 1915
 † Spondylus rarispina Deshayes, 1830 
Spondylus reesianus G. B. Sowerby III, 1903
Spondylus regius Linnaeus, 1758 - regal thorny oyster
Spondylus rippingalei Lamprell & Healy, 2001
Spondylus rubicundus Reeve, 1856
Spondylus senegalensis Schreibers, 1793
Spondylus sinensis Schreibers, 1793
Spondylus spinosus Schreibers, 1793
Spondylus squamosus Schreibers, 1793
Spondylus tenellus Reeve, 1856
Spondylus tenuis Schreibers, 1793
Spondylus tenuispinosus G. B. Sowerby II, 1847
Spondylus tenuitas Garrard, 1966
Spondylus variegatus Schreibers, 1793
Spondylus varius G. B. Sowerby I, 1827
 † Spondylus vaudini Deshayes, 1858
Spondylus versicolor Schreibers, 1793
Spondylus victoriae G. B. Sowerby II, 1860
Spondylus violacescens Lamarck, 1819
Spondylus virgineus Reeve, 1856
Spondylus visayensis Poppe & Tagaro, 2010
Spondylus zonalis Lamarck, 1819

Spondylus echinus Jousseaume in Lamy, 1927 (taxon inquirendum)
Spondylus imbricatus Perry, 1811 (nomen dubium)
Spondylus microlepos Lamarck, 1819 (nomen dubium)
Spondylus unicolor G. B. Sowerby II, 1847 (nomen dubium)
See also: Tikod amo, an undescribed species

References

External links
 Spondylidae pictures of the shells of most extant species.
 shells at the Rotterdam Natural History Museum
 Session Abstracts on Spondylus research at the 13th Meeting of the European Association of Archaeologists at Zadar, Croatia, September 2007
 Information about Spondylus from the website of the Gladys Archerd Shell Collection at Washington State University Tri-Cities Natural History Museum
 Article on "notched" Spondylus  Neolithic artifacts in Europe

Bibliography
 A full and constantly updated bibliography on Spondylus spp. in Aegean, Balkan, European and American contexts
 Lamprell, Kevin L.: Spondylus: Spiny Oyster Shells of the World, E. J. Brill, Leiden, 1987  

Spondylidae
Bivalve genera
Extant Triassic first appearances